The 2008 Asian Junior Women's Volleyball Championship was held in Taipei, Republic of China from 20 September to 28 September 2008.

Pools composition
The teams are seeded based on their final ranking at the 2006 Asian Junior Women's Volleyball Championship.

Preliminary round

Pool A

|}

|}

Pool B

|}

|}

Classification 9th–11th

Semifinals

|}

9th place

|}

Final round

Quarterfinals

|}

5th–8th semifinals

|}

Semifinals

|}

7th place

|}

5th place

|}

3rd place

|}

Final

|}

Final standing

Team Roster
Yuki Kawai, Kotoe Inoue, Kaori Kodaira, Saki Minemura, Nana Iwasaka, Hiroko Matsuura, Airi Kawahara, Rina Urabe, Aika Akutagawa, Erika Sakae, Miyu Nagaoka, Sayuri Tamura
Head Coach: Aihara Noboru

Awards
MVP:  Yuki Kawai
Best Scorer:  Chen Wan-ting
Best Spiker:  Chen Shih-ting
Best Blocker:  Yang Junjing
Best Server:  Joo Yea-na
Best Setter:  Yuki Kawai
Best Libero:  Kotoe Inoue

See also
 List of sporting events in Taiwan

External links
www.asianvolleyball.org

A
V
V
Asian women's volleyball championships
Asian Junior